Jakob Markus Schipper (19 July 1842 Augustgroden (today part of Stadland) - 20 January 1915 Vienna) was a German-Austrian philologist and English scholar.

Biography
He was the son of a farmer.  He studied modern languages in Bonn, Paris, Rome, and Oxford, collaborated on the revision of Bosworth's Anglo-Saxon Dictionary, and was professor of English philology at Königsberg from 1872 until 1877, when he received a like position in Vienna. There he was elected to the Academy of Sciences in 1887. He was rector of the University of Vienna 1901–02, and retired in 1913.

He received the honorary degree Doctor of Letters (D.Litt.) from the University of Oxford in October 1902, in connection with the tercentenary of the Bodleian Library.

Works
In addition to his work with Bosworth, he acted as editor of the Wiener Beiträge zur englischen Philologie (Vienna contributions to English philology; 1895–1900). He also published Englische Metrik (1881–88), an important work, abridged as the one-volume Grundriss der englischen Metrik (1895) (which was in turn published in English as A History of English Versification (1910)); Zur Kritik der Shakespeare-Bacon-Frage (1889), and Der Bacon-Bacillus (1896), and editions of the Alexis legends (1877–87), of Dunbar's poems (1892–94), and of the version of Bede's ecclesiastical history purported to be by Alfred the Great (1897–99).
He promoted the study of English at Austrian middle schools.

Notes

References

Attribution

External links
 
 

1842 births
1915 deaths
German philologists
Austrian philologists
Historical linguists of English
University of Bonn alumni
Alumni of the University of Oxford
Academic staff of the University of Königsberg
Academic staff of the University of Vienna
People from Wesermarsch
People from Oldenburg (state)